In propositional logic, material implication is a valid rule of replacement that allows for a conditional statement to be replaced by a disjunction in which the antecedent is negated. In other words, if  is true, then  must also be true, while if  is  true, then  cannot be true either; additionally, when  is not true,  may be either true or false.

Where "" is a metalogical symbol representing "can be replaced in a proof with," and P and Q are any given logical statements. To illustrate this, consider the following statements:

 : Sam ate an orange for lunch
 : Sam ate a fruit for lunch

Then, to say, "Sam ate an orange for lunch"  "Sam ate a fruit for lunch". Logically, if Sam did not eat a fruit for lunch, then Sam also cannot have eaten an orange for lunch (by contraposition). However, merely saying that Sam did not eat an orange for lunch provides no information on whether or not Sam ate a fruit (of any kind) for lunch.

Partial proof
Suppose we are given that . Then, we have  by the law of excluded middle (i.e. either  must be true, or  must not be true). 

Suppose, conversely, we are given . Then if  is true that rules out the first disjunct, so we have . In short, . However if  is false, then this entailment fails, because the first disjunct  is true which puts no constraint on the second disjunct . In sum,  the equivalence in the case of false  is only conventional, and hence the formal proof of equivalence is only partial. 

This can also be expressed with a truth table:

Example 
An example: we are given the conditional fact that if it is a bear, then it can swim. Then, all 4 possibilities in the truth table are compared to that fact.
 If it is a bear, then it can swim — T
 If it is a bear, then it can not swim — F
 If it is not a bear, then it can swim — T because it doesn’t contradict our initial fact.
 If it is not a bear, then it can not swim — T (as above)

References

Rules of inference
Theorems in propositional logic